"How's It Goin' Down" is a song by American rapper DMX, released as the fourth single from his debut studio album, It's Dark and Hell Is Hot. The song features R&B singer Faith Evans and was released to radio on June 9, 1998. The song would go on to be a modest hit, peaking at No. 70 on the Billboard Hot 100. The song contains a sample of "God Make Me Funky" by The Headhunters from the 1975 album, Survival of the Fittest.

Music video
Directed by Hype Williams, the music video provides a visual depiction of the song's story, detailing DMX's affair with the a woman named Tenika who is already in a relationship with the father of her two children. It features cameos by then-unknown artists Eve, Ja Rule, Drag-On and Irv Gotti, all of whom would rise to prominence in the following year.

Interpolations and samples
Canadian rapper and singer Drake incorporated the lyrics to the chorus of "How's It Goin' Down" in his own song, "U with Me?" from the album Views. American rapper Moneybagg Yo sampled "How's It Goin' Down" in his song "Scorpio".

Charts

Certifications

References

1998 singles
1998 songs
DMX (rapper) songs
Faith Evans songs
Ruff Ryders Entertainment singles
Def Jam Recordings singles
Music videos directed by Hype Williams
Dirty rap songs
Songs written by DMX (rapper)